Ahn Sang-yeong (November 18, 1938 February 4, 2004) was the 25th, 31st, and 32nd mayor of Busan, South Korea.

Ahn was educated at Busan High School, and graduated from Seoul National University with a degree in Civil Engineering in 1963.

Ahn was implicated in a bribery scandal involving the Jinheung company, and killed himself on February 4, 2004.

References

Mayors of Busan
Seoul National University alumni
Busan High School alumni
People from Busan
1938 births
2004 deaths
South Korean politicians who committed suicide
South Korean Buddhists